Life Is Beautiful is a 1997 Italian film.

Life Is Beautiful may also refer to:

Films 
Life Is Beautiful (1979 film), Soviet film directed by Grigori Chukhrai
Life Is Beautiful (1985 film), Yugoslav film
Life Is Beautiful (1997 film), Italian film directed by Roberto Benigni
Life Is Beautiful (2000 film), Indian Malayalam film directed by Fazil
Life Is Beautiful (2012 film), Telugu film directed by Sekhar Kammula
Life Is Beautiful (2014 film), Hindi film
Life Is Beautiful (2022 film), South Korean film

Television 
Life Is Beautiful (2010 TV series), a South Korean television drama
Life Is Beautiful (2015 TV series), a Singaporean television drama

Music
Life Is Beautiful Music & Art Festival, an annual event in Las Vegas, Nevada, US

Albums 
Life Is Beautiful (The Afters album) or the title song, 2013
Life Is Beautiful (Chicago Poodle album) or the title song, 2014
Life Is Beautiful (Tony Bennett album) or the title song (see below), 1975
Life Is Beautiful (soundtrack), from the Italian film, or the title song, "La vita è bella" (see below), 1997
Life Is Beautiful, or the title song, by Press Play, 2009
Life Is Beautiful, an EP by Monni, 2013

Songs 
"Life Is Beautiful" (Flow song), 2004
"Life Is Beautiful" (Fred Astaire song), 1974; covered by Tony Bennett, 1975
"Life Is Beautiful" (Sixx:A.M. song), 2007
"Life Is Beautiful" (Vega4 song), 2006
"La vita è bella" (song), from the Italian film Life Is Beautiful, 1997
"Life Is Beautiful", an unreleased song by Lana Del Rey
"Life Is Beautiful", by Lil Peep from Come Over When You're Sober, Pt. 2, 2018
"Life Is Beautiful", by Raven-Symoné from This Is My Time, 2004
"Life is Beautiful", a song from the video-game Deadly Premonition

Other

"Life Is Beautiful", first art show of Mr. Brainwash (Thierry Guetta) in Los Angeles

See also
 A Beautiful Life (disambiguation)
 Beautiful Life (disambiguation)
 La Vie est Belle (disambiguation) , "Life is Beautiful" in French
 La vita è bella (disambiguation) , "Life is Beautiful" in Italian